The 1977 Masters (officially the 1977 Benson & Hedges Masters) was a professional non-ranking snooker tournament that took place between Monday 7th and Friday 11 February 1977 at the New London Theatre in London, England.

Doug Mountjoy won his first professional title, defeating Ray Reardon 7–6 in the final.

Main draw

Final

Century breaks

None. Highest break: 88  Doug Mountjoy

Billiards
An English billiards tournament was held alongside the snooker event. Results are below.

References 

1977
Masters
Masters (snooker)
Masters (snooker)
Masters (snooker)